WDYD-LP (100.9 FM) is a radio station licensed to Merrill, Wisconsin, United States. The station is currently owned by The New Testament Church, Inc.

References

External links
 

DYD-LP
DYD-LP